Eska Music Awards (EMA) is a Polish awards ceremony for national and international music, launched in 2002 by Radio Eska. The awards were last presented in 2017.

Amongst the award winners are Jamelia, Alexis Jordan, t.A.T.u., 3 Doors Down, The Rasmus, Mattafix, Melanie C, Sugababes, Razorlight, September, Sarsa, Craig David, Margaret, The Killers, Matt Pokora, Katy Perry, Lady Gaga, Sunrise Avenue, OneRepublic, White Lies, Kesha, Basshunter, Inna, David Guetta, Nelly Furtado, Adam Lambert, Ed Sheeran and more.

2016 Eska Music Awards 

The 2016 Eska Music Awards were held on 26 August 2016 and was the 15th edition of the Radio Eska's annual music awards. The awards ceremony was held at Azoty Arena in Szczecin. Award nominations were revealed on 4 July 2016.

Performances

Nominees and winners 
The nominations were revealed on 4 July 2016.

2017 Eska Music Awards 

The 2017 Eska Music Awards were held on 17 June 2017 and was the 16th edition of the Radio Eska's annual music awards. The awards ceremony was held at Azoty Arena in Szczecin. Award nominations were revealed on 20 April 2017.

Performances

Nominees and winners 
The nominations were revealed on 20 April 2017.

References

External links

Eska Music Awards official site
Radio Eska

Polish music awards
2002 establishments in Poland
Awards established in 2002
Culture in Łódź
Culture in Szczecin